Alternate Spaces is an album led by bassist Cecil McBee recorded in 1979 and first released on the India Navigation label.

Reception

In his review for AllMusic,  Scott Yanow stated "The often melodic but unpredictable music definitely holds one's interest". JazzTimes writer Bill Shoemaker observed "McBee's program of boldly lined cookers, poignant ballads, and daring structural statements, elicit consistently strong work from Freeman, Pullen, Moye, trumpeter Joe Gardner, and drummer Allen Nelson. As a soloist, McBee nails everything from fleet blues choruses to wistful lyricism".

Track listing
All compositions by Cecil McBee
 "Alternate Spaces" - 9:05
 "Consequence" - 8:15
 "Come Sunrise" - 6:43		
 "Sorta, Kinda Blue" - 4:07		
 "Expression" - 7:13

Personnel
Cecil McBee - bass
Joe Gardner - trumpet
Chico Freeman - tenor saxophone, soprano saxophone, flute
Don Pullen - piano
Allen Nelson - drums 
Famoudou Don Moye -  percussion

References

 

1979 albums
Cecil McBee albums
India Navigation albums